Temple Sinai is a Reform synagogue located at 3509 South Glencoe in Denver, Colorado.

History
It was started in 1967 by Rabbi Raymond A. Zwerin, who had been ordained three years prior at the Hebrew Union College.

The workbook Tzedakah, Gemilut Chasadim, and Ahavah: A Manual for World Repair (1990), by Joel Lurie Grishaver and Beth Huppin, was piloted at the synagogue.

In September 1995, more than 650 members of the synagogue spent a day removing graffiti in Denver, painting buildings, cooking pastries, repairing toys, scraping walls, and potting plants, in an effort to fulfill a mitzvah.

Services
It is a full-functioning synagogue with a religious school catering to preschoolers through confirmation students. Services are held every Friday night, Saturday morning, and on holidays. The synagogue has a pre-school.

Building
The synagogue has a large multicolored mural of children at play. The current building was built in 1984.  In 2003, a meditation garden was constructed in 2003.

Recognition
In 2011, Temple Sinai received a $21,000 grant from the Rose Community Foundation for the integration of special-needs children into its religious school.

The temple's maintenance manual was featured in The Temple Management Manual (2003), by the National Association of Temple Administrators (U.S.), Union of American Hebrew Congregations.

References

External links
 Temple Sinai Website
 Facebook page

Synagogues in Denver
Jewish organizations established in 1967
Buildings and structures in Denver
Reform synagogues in Colorado
1967 establishments in Colorado
Synagogues completed in 1984